SET2 is a drug which acts as a selective antagonist for the TRPV2 receptor. It is moderately potent with an IC50 of 460nM, but is highly selective for TRPV2 over the other subtypes of TRPV, and is the first such compound to be developed. A role has been suggested for TRPV2 in tumor metastasis, making this a target of interest in the treatment of cancer.

See also
 HC-067047
 ZINC17988990

References 

Thioethers
Pyrimidines